Dascyllus abudafur, the Indian Ocean humbug,  is a species of ray-finned fish from the family Pomacentridae, the clownfishes and damselfishes. It is found from  the Red Sea, along the coasts of eastern Africa to South Africa, the Seychelles, Comoros, Madagascar and Mascarene Islands east to the Sunda Islands. It has been classified as synonymous with the Pacific humbug Dascyllus aruanus  and is not included in FishBase but studies have shown that the two taxa were shown to be genetically and morphologically different. The specific name is derived from the Arabic word for this species Abu-dafur Jabûd.

References

abudafur
Fish described in 1775
Taxa named by Peter Forsskål